Adam Mardel is an American pop singer best-known for his work with Second Alibi and for founding the record label E2A Music Group, LLC.

Career
Adam was an opening act on Aaron Carter's After Party Tour in 2013. In the spring of 2017 Adam launched a concert series called "E2A Presents" to feature bands and artists of different genres. In a 2020 interview on WGN (AM) with Paul Lisnek Adam announced that he is working on a memoir and new music.

Personal life
On March 29, 2021 Adam announced via social media that he was engaged to Michael Liedke.

Discography

Solo

Singles
2008: "One Reason"
2010: "Back Again (feat. MGC CHLD)"
2011: "Hypnotized (feat. The ResistantOne of Analog Resistance)"
2011: "As You Walk Away"
2012: "Freak Boy"

Second Alibi

Singles
2015: "Ignite"
2015: "Lost"
2016: "Red (Radio Edit)"
2016: "Waste of Time (Urban Mix)"
2016: "Back to You"
2017: "Soldier (feat. Lucas Bolander)"

Extended plays
2016: "Ultimatum"

Studio Albums
2017: "Ultimatum: The Ultimate Edition"
2023: "Ultimatum (International Version"

Concert Tours

Solo

Promotional 
2011: Eleven Twelve Promo Tour
2012: Unbound Tour

Supporting 
2011: Neon Pop Tour (w/ Adam Calvert of MTV's 'Taking the Stage')
2012: R.O.A.R. Tour (w/ Romance on a Rocketship)
2013: After Party Tour (w/ Aaron Carter)
2014: Wonderful World Tour (w/ Aaron Carter)

Second Alibi

Promotional 
2014-2015: Ohio Boy Band Search Tour
2016: Hey UK! Tour

Supporting 
2016: Social Jam Tour
2017: LØVË Tour (w/ Aaron Carter)

Co-headlining 
2017: E2A Presents Tour

Headlining 
2016: Ultimate Tour

Filmography

Video Shorts
2017: "E2A Presents: Live at Gloria Theatre" – Himself
2018: "Making it Series: Meet the Team Behind E2A Music Group" – Himself

Specials
2012: "Adam Mardel: Talent Showcase"

Miscellaneous Credits

Awards

Ohio Music Awards

References

American male pop singers
Living people
1989 births
Singers from Ohio
Gay songwriters
Gay singers
American gay musicians
American LGBT songwriters
American LGBT singers
20th-century LGBT people
21st-century LGBT people